The alpine meadow mabuya (Trachylepis irregularis) is a species of skink found in Uganda and Kenya.

References

Trachylepis
Reptiles described in 1922
Taxa named by Einar Lönnberg